Pemphigus foliaceus is an autoimmune blistering disease (bullous disorder) of the skin. Pemphigus foliaceus causes a characteristic inflammatory attack at the subcorneal layer of epidermis, which results in skin lesions that are scaly or crusted erosions with an erythematous (red) base. Mucosal involvement is absent even with widespread disease.

If there is an autoimmune IgG buildup in the epidermis, then nearly all of the antibodies are aimed against desmoglein 1. The effect of the antibodies and the immunological pathway is most likely one of three mechanisms:
 Steric hindrance of the desmoglein 1: The antibody caps off the site for intracellular binding to another keratinocyte.
 Activation of an endocytic pathway: The antibody activates a pathway which causes an internalization of desmogleïn 1, which in turn causes a loss of adhesion.
 Disruption of function: In this case, the antibody blocks the desmoglein 1 from being formed into a desmosome. This in turn causes a loss of adhesion with acantholysis as a result.

Cause

The National Institute of Arthritis and Musculoskeletal and Skin Diseases describes it like this:

Normally, our immune system produces antibodies that attack viruses and harmful bacteria to keep us healthy. In people with pemphigus, however, the immune system mistakenly attacks the cells in the epidermis, or top layer of the skin, and the mucous membranes. The immune system produces antibodies against proteins in the skin known as desmogleins. These proteins form the glue that keeps skin cells attached and the skin intact. When desmogleins are attacked, skin cells separate from each other and fluid can collect between the layers of skin, forming blisters that do not heal. In some cases, these blisters can cover a large area of skin.

Diagnosis
Pemphigus foliaceus is diagnosed base on history, biopsy of the affected skin, and testing either a blood sample or a skin sample for the antibodies that cause pemphigus.

Treatment

Epidemiology
Pemphigus is endemic in the rural areas of Brazil, especially along inland riverbeds.

History
Pierre Louis Alphée Cazenave first described the disease in 1844.

See also 
 List of cutaneous conditions
 Pemphigus

References

External links 

Chronic blistering cutaneous conditions
Rare diseases